Bremerhaven Stadthalle is an arena in Bremerhaven, Germany. It is primarily used for Events. Bremerhaven Stadthalle opened in 1974 and holds 6,000 people without seating.

This is the home arena of the Eisbären Bremerhaven.

External links

Indoor arenas in Germany
Indoor ice hockey venues in Germany
Basketball venues in Germany
Stadthalle
Sports venues in Bremen (state)